It Still Moves is the third album by the rock band My Morning Jacket. The album garnered positive reviews and is often considered the band's best work alongside Z. The song "Run Thru" is included in Rolling Stone's "100 Greatest Guitar Songs". The album also marks the first appearance of drummer Patrick Hallahan, as well as the final appearances of guitarist Johnny Quaid and keyboardist Danny Cash.

The album was remixed and reissued by ATO Records in May 2016.

Album art
The album cover and art work for It Still Moves shows one of the giant stuffed bears that are always displayed on stage when the band performs live. Drummer Patrick Hallahan told Rolling Stone magazine that "[the bears are] our spirit animal guides. They make sure we're going in the right direction."

Reception

Allmusic: "My Morning Jacket may be a journey through the past, but it's also a solid step into something rock & roll has been missing...melody, extremely catchy and well-written songs... and a love of the great pop continuum that translates into something new." Grade: 4/5
Pitchfork Media:"It Still Moves...[is] an album by turns beautiful and possessed, by others raucous and fiery. My Morning Jacket have made the move to the bigs in tremendous style...[the album's length, its one major flaw] is a small concern considering the riches that await inside." Grade: 8.3/10
Spin Magazine: "This time, the band lug the still-smoking amps from their lightning-strike live show into the studio and let the noise chase the midnite vultures away." Grade: 9.1/10
Village Voice: "...and I guess his (Jim James's) boys are trickier than Crazy Horse, just not in any way you haven't heard before. Then there's his filtered drawl, his straitened tune sense, his lyrics you feel cheated straining for, his 12 songs in 72 minutes." Grade: C

The album currently has a score of 83 at critic aggregator site Metacritic.

The album has sold 265,000 copies in the United States as of April 2016.

Track listing

Personnel
Jim James – vocals, guitars, artwork
Johnny Quaid – guitars, vocals, artwork
Tom Blankenship – bass
Patrick Hallahan – drums
Danny Cash – keyboards, artwork, graphic design, layout design
Niko Bolas – studio construction
Bill Burrs – A&R
Greg Calbi – mastering
Sam Erickson – photography, cover art
Jim James – producer
Danny Kadar – engineer, mixing
Michael MacDonald – A&R
Archie Mitchell – engineer
Kathy Olliges – artwork
Linda Park – artwork
Jojo Pennebaker – photography, cover art
Steve Ralbovsky – A&R
Lester Snell – horn arrangements

Charts

Album

References

External links
 

My Morning Jacket albums
2003 albums
ATO Records albums
Albums produced by Jim James